Temognatha grandis is a species of beetles belonging to the family Buprestidae.

Description
The body colour is black, with a yellow border on each side. Head and legs are black. Elytra are punctato-striate. These beetles are florivore and feed on the flowers of various trees and shrubs (especially Angophora hispida and Leptospermum species). Larvae are wood-borers of Eucalyptus gracilis, Eucalyptus oleosa, Eucalyptus uncinata and Eucalyptus foecunda.

Distribution and habitat
This species is present in New South Wales. These beetles can be found in drainage basins and coastal and oceanic zones.

References

Buprestidae
Woodboring beetles
Beetles described in 1805